Gabriele Zeilinger (15 November 1917 – 6 July 2011) was an Austrian fencer. She competed in the women's individual foil event at the 1948 Summer Olympics.

References

1917 births
2011 deaths
Austrian female foil fencers
Olympic fencers of Austria
Fencers at the 1948 Summer Olympics